Vyron or Vyronas may refer to:
The Greek name for George Gordon Byron, 6th Baron Byron
Vyronas, a suburb of Athens, Greece, named after Lord Byron
Vyron (given name)

See also